Steffan Andrew Piolet (born 8 August 1988) is an English cricketer. He specialises in short format cricket and is a right-handed batsman and right-arm medium-pace bowler who played over 100 matches for Sussex and Warwickshire County Cricket Clubs

Piolet was born in Redhill and is of Norwegian descent. He attended the University of Wales Institute Cardiff shortly before leaving to concentrate fully on his cricket career. He attended Harlands Primary School,  Warden Park School and Central Sussex College.

Having represented Sussex, Worcestershire, and Warwickshire in Second XI cricket, Piolet made his List A debut during the 2009 season, against Somerset, during the 2009 Friends Provident Trophy. He scored two runs and took bowling figures of 0/28 from six overs. Piolet's first-class debut came in June 2009 against Durham UCCE at The Racecourse ground in Durham. Piolet had an excellent game with the ball, taking ten wickets: 6/17 in the first innings and 4/26 in the second.

References

External links

1988 births
Living people
English cricketers
Sussex cricketers
Warwickshire cricketers
People from Redhill, Surrey
English people of Norwegian descent